A machine is a device that uses energy to perform some activity or task.  

Machine, Machines, Machinery, The Machine, or The Machines may also refer to:

Term of art
More specific applications of the general term
 Machine (mechanical) device designed to apply forces and control movement
 Machine (patent), one of the four statutory categories of patent-eligible subject matter under United States patent law

Computing
 "machine", slang for computer or server
 Abstract machine, a theoretical model of a computer hardware or software system used in automata theory
 Turing machine, an abstract model of a computer
 virtual machine, a computing machine implemented in software rather than directly in hardware
 Machine-generated data
 Machines (video game), a 1999 real-time strategy game for Microsoft Windows
 The Machine (computer architecture), a computer architecture project announced in 2014 by Hewlett Packard

Personal nickname
The following are nicknamed "The Machine":
 Albert Pujols (born 1980), Dominican-American baseball player
 Sasha Vujačić (born 1984), Slovenian basketball player
 Bert Kreischer American stand-up comedian (born 1973), actor and reality television host
 James Wade (born 1983), English darts player
 Vimael Machín (born 1993), Puerto Rican baseball player

Music
Machine (band) a late-1970s American funk disco group
Machine (producer), American record producer
The Machine (band), a US Pink Floyd tribute band formed in 1988
Machinery Records, a German record label founded in 1989
In Florence and the Machine, the band backing lead singer Florence Welch
Machine (Higdon), a 2003 orchestral composition by Jennifer Higdon

Albums
Machine (Artension album), a 2000 album by neo-classical progressive metal band Artension
 Machine (Crack the Sky album), a 2010 album by Crack the Sky
Machine (Static-X album), a 2001 album by Static-X
Machine (EP), a 2002 EP by Yeah Yeah Yeahs and also the title of a single from that EP
Machines (EP), a 1966 EP by Manfred Mann
Machine, a 1994 album by Paul Dean

Songs
 "Machines" (or 'Back to Humans'), a 1984 song by Queen
"Machines" (Biffy Clyro song), 2007
Machines (Red Flag song), 1992
 "Machine" (Imagine Dragons song), 2018
"Machine" (Theatre of Tragedy song), 2001
"The Machine" a song from deathcore band In the Midst of Lions
"The Machine", a 2006 song by Angels & Airwaves from the album We Don't Need to Whisper
"The Machine", a 2007 song by Reverend and the Makers from the album The State of Things
"The Machine", a 2008 song by Lemon Demon from the album View Monster
 "The Machines", a marching band work composed by Gary P. Gilroy
 "Machines", a song by The Jealous Girlfriends from the eponymous album
 "Machine", a 2009 song by Regina Spektor from the album Far
 "Machine", a 1998 song by Vixen from the album Tangerine
 "Machine", a 2018 song by Anne-Marie from the album Speak Your Mind

Sports
 Chicago Machine (MLL), a major league lacrosse team based in Bridgeport, Illinois
 Montreal Machine, an American Football team based in Canada from 1991 to 1992
 The Machines (professional wrestling), a tag team in the 1980s
 The Machine (Richard), a character in the 2013 Irish film The Stag (also called The Bachelor Weekend)
 La Máquina (Spanish for "the Machine"), nickname of the River Plate association football team of the early 1940s

Fiction
 Machine (novel), a 1930 Japanese novel by Riichi Yokomitsu
 Machine (2006 film), an American film
 Machine (2017 film), a Bollywood film
 The Machine (2013 film), a British science fiction film
 The Machine (2023 film), an upcoming American action comedy film
 Machines (Nier: Automata), a fictional robotic race in the video game Nier: Automata
 The Machine, a surveillance computer in the 2011–2016 American TV series Person of Interest
 The Machine, the interstellar-travel device in Contact a 1985 novel by Carl Sagan
 Machine, a character in the 1999 film 8mm
 Alexis Machine / George Stark, a character in the 1989 novel The Dark Half by Stephen King
Machine, a 2020 novel by Elizabeth Bear

Other uses
 Mount Machine, mountain in Japan
 Political machine, a vote-delivering and political power-broking system
 AMC Machine, 1970 and 1971 muscle cars built by the American Motors Corporation (AMC) 
 The Machine (social group), a University of Alabama coalition of fraternities and sororities
 The Machine: Bride of Pin•Bot, a 1991 pinball machine made by Williams

See also
 
 
 Rage Against the Machine, American rock band
"My Machines", a song by Battles from the album Gloss Drop